Alauli Assembly constituency is an assembly constituency in Khagaria district in the Indian state of Bihar. The seat is reserved for scheduled castes.

Overview
The constituency comprises the Alauli community development blocks Baraiy, Rani Larhi, Goriyami, Haripur, Roun, Saharbanni, Bhikharighat, Bahadurpur, Budhaura, Sonihar, Sumbha, Sakar-Pura, Belasimri, Olapur Gangour, Tetarabad, Jalkoura, Janhagira and Dhusmuri Bishanpur gram panchayats of Khagaria CD Block.

Alauli Assembly constituency is part of No. 25 Khagaria (Lok Sabha constituency).

Members of Legislative Assembly

Election results

2020

2015

References

External links
 

Assembly constituencies of Bihar
Politics of Begusarai district